Barbara Ambrose is a botanist working in the field of Plant Evolutionary Developmental Biology (Evo-Devo). As the Director of Laboratory Research at the New York Botanical Garden, Ambrose is a prolific scholar and leader and mentor in her field who is interested in patterns in plant diversity on macro and micro scales.

Education 
Ambrose earned a Ph.D. in Biology from the University of California, San Diego in June 2000, starting her career as a developmental geneticist working on maize (Zea mays) flowers. She also holds a B.Sc. in Biology from University of the Virgin Islands, St. Thomas which she earned in 1994.

One of Ambrose's Ph.D. articles Molecular and genetic analyses of the Silky1 gene reveal conservation in floral organ specification between eudicots and monocots, published in Molecular Cell was one of the first Plant Evo-Devo papers, and has been cited nearly 500 times, as per Google Scholar metrics.

Career

National Autonomous University of Mexico
Ambrose began her career first as a National Science Foundation International Postdoctoral fellow (2000-2002) and then as a Postdoctoral Fellow (2002–2003) at the National Autonomous University of Mexico (UNAM) in Mexico. During this time, her work was also focused on floral evo-devo in Lacandonia schismatica, a monocot with inside-out flowers.

Massey University
Ambrose was next a Lecturer in the Institute of Molecular BioScience (IMBS) at Massey University in New Zealand from October 2003 until August 2008, where here research focused on the control of plant development at the molecular level, including Evo-Devo research related to fruit. At Massey, Ambrose was involved in the planning of the Manawatu Microscopy & Imaging Centre (MMIC). She also developed a course in Plant Development and worked on a project with Plant Biology and Massey gardening staff to label plants in the living collection, making this collection more accessible.

City University of New York
Since 2008, Ambrose has been an Adjunct Professor for the Graduate Center, City University of New York (CUNY) in the Plant Science subprogram where she has taught courses on Plant Development and Comparative Morphology of Vascular Plants.

New York Botanical Garden

Ambrose has worked at the New York Botanical Garden since 2008. Hired as an Assistant Curator in the Plant Genomics department in 2008, she was promoted to Associate Curator in 2014. In 2017, Ambrose was named Director of Laboratory Research. Ambrose's research interest is in  Plant Evolutionary Developmental Genomics with research foci in Evolution as it relates to Molecular Biology and Genomics and Biochemistry as they relate to Gene Expression/Gene Regulation and Genetics/Development. Her Evo-Devo research has continued to expand into work with leaves and seeds, using the latest scientific techniques to understand the evolution of morphological novelties. Recent projects also include the use of machine learning to identify herbarium specimens through kaggle competitions, notably in 2019 and 2020.

Current research projects
 Evolution and Development in Lycophytes and Ferns
 Fruit Evolution and Development
 Transforming Selaginella Apoda Into a Major Model Species
 Elaphoglossum – the deer tongue ferns

Scientific outreach
In addition to her academic work, Ambrose is very active in scientific outreach activities in New York City, through CUNY, NYBG, and other local organizations including Cooper Hewitt.

Selected works and publications

Publications

 B.A. Ambrose and A. Vasco (2016) Bringing the multicellular fern meristem into focus. New Phytologist 210: 790-793. 
 Ambrose, B.A. (2010) MADS-Box Genes in Plant Evolution and Development. International Journal of Plant Developmental Biology 4:  30-37.
 B.A. Ambrose, S. Espinosa-Matías, S. Vázquez-Santana, F. Vergara-Silva, E. Martínez, J. Márquez-Guzmán and E. Alvarez-Buylla. (2006) Comparative developmental series of the Mexican triurids support a euanthial interpretation for the unusual reproductive axes of Lacandonia schismatica (Triuridaceae). Am. J. Bot. 93: 15-35.
 B.A. Ambrose and K. Prasad. MADS about Plant Development. (2004) NZ Bioscience (August) 8-13.
 B.A. Ambrose, D.R. Lerner, P. Ciceri, C.M. Padilla, M.F. Yanofsky, and R.J. Schmidt (2000) Molecular and genetic analyses of the Silky1 gene reveal conservation in floral organ specification between eudicots and monocots. Molecular Cell 5: 569-579.

Books
Barbara A. Ambrose and Michael D. Purugganan, Editors. 2013. ‘The Evolution of Plant Form’ Annual Plant Reviews 45. Wiley-Blackwell, London.
Barbara A. Ambrose. 2013. The Morphology and Development of Lycophytes in ‘The Evolution of Plant Form’ B.A. Ambrose and M.D. Purugganan (Eds.) Annual Plant Reviews 45. Wiley-Blackwell, London.
Barbara A. Ambrose and Cristina Ferrandiz. 2013. Development and the Evolution of Form in ‘The Evolution of Plant Form’ B.A. Ambrose and M.D. Purugganan (Eds.) Annual Plant Reviews 45. Wiley-Blackwell, London.

References

External links 

21st-century American botanists
American women botanists
Living people
University of California, San Diego alumni
University of the Virgin Islands alumni
Year of birth missing (living people)
21st-century American women scientists
Evolutionary biologists
Developmental biologists
Women evolutionary biologists
Genomics
American molecular biologists